The Eye of the Heron is a 1978 science fiction novel by American author Ursula K. Le Guin which was first published in the science fiction anthology Millennial Women.

Plot introduction
The Eye of the Heron is a science fiction novel set on the fictional planet of Victoria in a speculative future, probably sometime in the 22nd century, when the planet has been colonized for about a century and has no communication with Earth. The protagonist is a young woman called Luz but the story is told in the third person and the reader sees events from the point of view of several different characters. The Eye of the Heron is usually treated as one of Le Guin's minor novels although it exhibits her characteristic prose style and themes.

Title
The title is a reference to a fictional animal on the planet Victoria which early colonists called heron because of some superficial similarities to Earth heron. The characters' encounters with these animals occur at moments of significant introspection, particularly when they are considering that which they perceive as alien, or other, in relation to themselves.

Plot summary

The planet of Victoria received two waves of colonists from Earth: first two prison ships founding a penal colony and then one ship of political exiles. The descendants of the prisoners mostly inhabit the City. The descendants of the political exiles, the "People of Peace", inhabit Shantih Town, which is known to the City dwellers as Shanty Town. The Shantih Towners, whose primary occupation is farming, want to settle another valley further away from the City. The City "Bosses" do not want to lose the control they believe they have over the Shanty Towners and so they take action to try to prevent any settlement beyond their sphere of influence.

Characters

City characters
 Luz Marina Falco Cooper
 Luis Burnier Falco (Luz's father and a Boss)
 Herman Macmilan
 Captain Eden

Shantih Town characters
 Vera Adelson
 Lev Shults
 Southwind
 Andre
 Hari
 Elia

Major themes
The major themes in The Eye of the Heron are common to much of Le Guin's fiction and include the social constructions of gender, interactions between individuals from different societies, intra-actions within societies, and contact with that which is perceived as alien or other. The novel also explores different forms of social and political organization by juxtaposing pacifist anarchism with violent oligarchy. The characters' metaphorical internal journeys are reflected in literal external journeys throughout the plot.

When asked, in a 1995 interview, what role the feminist movement had played in her writing, Le Guin situated The Eye of the Heron in the context of her development as a writer:

Allusions in other works
The Eye of the Heron contains the phrase "beginning place". Le Guin incorporated it into the title of her 1980 novel The Beginning Place.

Awards and nominations
 1979, Locus Award, Best SF Novel category, 21st place.

Release details
 1978, in Millennial Women, edited by Virginia Kidd, U.S., Delacorte Press (Dell Publishing), pp. 305, 1978, hardcover
 1979, in Millennial Women, edited by Virginia Kidd, Dell Publishing, April 1979, serial?
 1980, in The Eye of the Heron and Other Stories, edited by Virginia Kidd, UK, Panther Books (Granada Publishing), pp. 251, 5 June 1980, paperback
 1982, The Eye of the Heron, UK, Victor Gollancz, pp. 122 or 144, 30 September 1982, hardcover
 1982, The Eye of the Heron, U.S., Harper & Row (HarperCollins), pp. 179, December 1982, hardcover
 1984, The Eye of the Heron, Bantam Books (Random House), pp. 179, 1 August 1984, paperback
 1988, The Eye of the Heron, U.S., J. Curley, pp. 246, 6 January 1988, large print, paperback,
 1991, The Eye of the Heron, U.S., Harper Paperbacks (HarperCollins), pp. 198 or 208, 1 January 1991, paperback
 1991, The Eye of the Heron with The Word for World is Forest, UK, VGSF (Victor Gollancz), pp. 256 or 301, 6 June 1991, paperback
 2000, The Eye of the Heron, Thorndike Press (Thomson Gale), pp. 204, January 2000, large print?, hardcover
 2003, The Eye of the Heron, Starscape Books (Tor Books), pp. 192, September 2003, paperback

See also 
 List of books about anarchism

References
Notes

Bibliography

External links
 The Eye of the Heron page, including excerpt, at Tor Books

1978 American novels
Novels by Ursula K. Le Guin
1978 science fiction novels
Feminist science fiction novels
American science fiction novels
Anarchist fiction
Cengage books
Delacorte Press books